Order of Ștefan cel Mare, alternatively known as the Order of Stephen the Great is a state award of Moldova, established on 30 June 1992. It is the highest military order of the nation. It is named after Stephen III of Moldavia, who was the Voivode of Moldavia from 1457 and 1504.

List of recipients

Individual 

 Petru Lucinschi (2010)
 Traian Băsescu (2015)
Vasilii Calmoi, retired brigadier general, first Commander of the Border Guard Troops (2020)

Institutional 
 Special Forces Brigade "Fulger" (5 December 2011)
 Ștefan cel Mare Police Academy (5 March 2012)
 National Anticorruption Center (6 June 2017)
 State Protection and Guard Service of Moldova (24 January 2019)
Police Directorate of the Chisinau Municipality of the General Police Inspectorate (2017)

References

External links 

 Закон Республики Молдова Nr. 1123 от 30.07.1992 «О государственных наградах Республики Молдова»
 Награды мира

Orders, decorations, and medals of Moldova
1992 establishments in Moldova
Awards established in 1992